Al Jaish Stadium, is a multi-use stadium in Baghdad, Iraq.  It is used mostly for football matches and serves as the home stadium of Al Jaish.  The stadium holds 6,000 people.

References

Football venues in Iraq
Sport in Baghdad